Kamla Nehru Park is situated on Dr. Ketkar Road, Erandwana, Pune. The 10 acres park has a jogging track, Playground for kids, a fountain and two lawns. A military jet (HAL HF-24 Marut) is also kept in one of the lawns. There are stalls of food item outside this park's main gate. The a temple of Lord Dutta next to this park. This park is couple of kilometers from Deccan Gymkhana.

References

External links
 Kamla Nehru Park, Pune

Parks in Pune
Memorials to Kamala Nehru
Year of establishment missing